Tim Sullivan is an American sports writer. He has been a journalist for over 35 years and has formerly worked for U-T San Diego and The Cincinnati Enquirer, and currently writes for the Louisville Courier-Journal as a member of their sports staff. Sullivan's 2012 dismissal from U-T San Diego drew criticism after Sullivan announced via Twitter that he was no longer working for the paper. Sullivan joined The Courier-Journal later that same year.

Awards
Cincinnati Magazine, Worst Sports Writer, 1986 
Cincinnati Magazine, Best Sports Writer, 1988
Best of Gannett, 1988 
NSSA Hall of Fame nominee for California Sportswriter, 2011

References

American male journalists
American sportswriters
Living people
Year of birth missing (living people)